Jeff Curran (born 15 April 1961 in Glasgow, Scotland) is a Scottish-born Australian former soccer player. His
son Luke has trained with Sarawak FA in spring 2017 but the transfer never happened because the Sarawak immigration law reads that in order to be recognized as a local player, they would need at least one parent from Sarawak.

Career

Australia
Playing for a host of clubs in his native Scotland, Curran then relocated to Australia where he plied his trade for Floreat Athena, staying there for 4 years. Earning a reputation as one of the best defenders there with his performances, he won numerous awards with the club, including two Player of the Year awards in 1988 and 1989. Besides this, the Australian lifted three D'Orsogna Cup titles and one league championship with the club, gaining three appearances for the Western Australia state soccer team as well.

Sarawak
Brought in by coach Alan Vest together with two Australians to bolster Sarawak FA in 1991, Curran won several trophies with the club, playing for Hong Kong Martini just before his Malaysian move.

Working as a police officer for the Police Service of Scotland in Glasgow, the former defender enjoyed Sarawak due to its natural beauty and the gregariousness of the people there

Personal life
Has a wife and two children named Jade and Luke. Jade now has a son named James.

References

External links
 Veterans bid good luck to Crocs in Malaysia Cup

1961 births
Living people
Australian soccer players
Australian people of Scottish descent
Association football defenders
Sarawak FA players
Footballers from Glasgow
Australian expatriate sportspeople in Malaysia
Australian expatriate soccer players
Expatriate footballers in Malaysia
Expatriate soccer players in Australia
Expatriate footballers in Hong Kong